Daniel Jakiel (born 14 November 1990) is a Zimbabwean cricketer who currently represents the Malawi national team. He made his List A debut for Mashonaland Eagles in the 2018–19 Pro50 Championship on 23 February 2019. He was the leading wicket-taker in the tournament, with thirteen dismissals in four matches. He made his Twenty20 debut for Mashonaland Eagles in the 2018–19 Stanbic Bank 20 Series on 11 March 2019.

In September 2019, he was named in Zimbabwe's Twenty20 International (T20I) squad for the 2019–20 Singapore Tri-Nation Series. He made his T20I debut for Zimbabwe, against Nepal, in the Singapore Tri-Nation Series on 1 October 2019.

In December 2020, he was selected to play for the Eagles in the 2020–21 Logan Cup. He made his first-class debut on 31 January 2022, for Eagles in the 2021–22 Logan Cup in Zimbabwe. In September 2022, he was named in Malawi's T20I squad for the 2022 ACA Africa T20 Cup. He made his T20I debut for Malawi against Cameroon on 15 September 2022.

References

External links
 

1990 births
Living people
Zimbabwean cricketers
Zimbabwe Twenty20 International cricketers
Malawian cricketers
Malawi Twenty20 International cricketers
Dual international cricketers
Mashonaland Eagles cricketers
Place of birth missing (living people)